Purcell High School may refer to:

Purcell High School, Cincinnati, now Purcell Marian High School
Purcell High School (Oklahoma), Purcell, Oklahoma

See also
 Purcell School, UK